Who Do You Think You Are? is a British genealogy documentary series that has aired on the BBC since 2004. In each episode, a celebrity traces their family tree. It is made by the production company Wall to Wall. The programme has regularly attracted an audience of more than 6 million viewers. More than 150 episodes have been produced.

List of episodes

Series 1 (2004)

Series 2 (2006)

Series 3 (2006)

Adoption special (2007)

Series 4 (2007)

Series 5 (2008)

Series 6 (2009)

Series 7 (2010)

Series 8 (2011)

Series 9 (2012)

Series 10 (2013)

Series 11 (2014)

Series 12 (2015)
On 23 June 2015, the BBC confirmed the lineup for Series 12, which began on 13 August 2015.

Series 13 (2016–17)
On 13 July 2016, the line-up for the 13th series was confirmed. The series began on 24 November 2016.

Series 14 (2017)
On 23 June 2017, the BBC announced the line-up for the programme's 14th series, which would again comprise 10 episodes.

Series 15 (2018)
On 10 May 2018, the BBC announced the line-up of celebrities taking part in Series 15, which aired during the summer of 2018.

Series 16 (2019)
On 9 June 2019, the BBC announced the celebrities taking part in Series 16. The line-up features Kate Winslet, Daniel Radcliffe, Sharon Osbourne, Mark Wright, Naomie Harris, Paul Merton, Katherine Ryan and Jack and Michael Whitehall. The series began on 22 July 2019.

Series 17 (2020)
On 23 September 2020, the BBC announced the celebrities taking part in Series 17, consisting of only four episodes as production was halted due to the COVID-19 pandemic. The line-up features Jodie Whittaker, David Walliams, Ruth Jones and Liz Carr.

Series 18 (2021)
On 13 September 2021, the BBC announced the celebrities taking part in Series 18, consisting of seven episodes. The line-up features Ed Balls, Judi Dench, Pixie Lott, Joe Lycett, Alex Scott, Joe Sugg and Josh Widdicombe. The series began on 12 October 2021.

Series 19 (2022)
On 10 May 2022, the BBC announced the celebrities taking part in Series 19, consisting of five episodes. The line-up features Sue Perkins, Richard Osman, Matt Lucas, Anna Maxwell Martin and Ralf Little. The series began on 26 May 2022.

Home media
Series 1–11, 13, 15-17 of Who Do You Think You Are? are all available on Region 2 DVD.

A box set of series 1–4 is available, distributed by Acorn Media UK.

Notes

References

Lists of British non-fiction television series episodes